Video Pinball is a video game programmed by Bob Smith and released by Atari, Inc. in 1980 for the Atari VCS (renamed to the Atari 2600 in 1982). The Sears rebranded version for its Tele-Games system is Arcade Pinball.

Gameplay

Video Pinball is a loose simulation of an arcade pinball machine: ball launcher, flippers, bumpers, and spinners. Hitting the Atari logo on the playfield four times awards an extra ball.

Pulling down on the Atari joystick pulls the pinball machine plunger back while pressing the joystick button shoots the ball into the playfield. The left and right flippers are activated by moving the joystick controller left or right. The ball can be nudged (as in nudging a table gently in real life) by holding down the joystick button and moving the controller in a particular direction. Nudging too much results in a tilt, forcing the ball to drain.

See also

List of Atari 2600 games

References

External links
Video Pinball at Atari Mania

1980 video games
Atari 2600 games
Atari 2600-only games
Pinball video games
Video games developed in the United States